Lomme was a commune in the Nord département of northern France. It was absorbed as a commune associée by the city of Lille in 2000. At the 1999 census its population was 27,940 inhabitants. Its population was 28,092 in 2019.

Heraldry

References

External links
 Lomme website

Lille
Former communes of Nord (French department)
Populated places disestablished in 2000